The Atherfield Clay Formation is a Geological formation in Southern England. Part of the Lower Greensand Group it dates to the Aptian age of the Early Cretaceous. The deposit is of marine origin largely consisting of massive yellowish brown to pale grey mudstones. The pterosaur Vectidraco is known from the formation. As is the Sandownid turtle Sandownia.

References 

Cretaceous England
Geologic formations of England
Geologic formations of the United Kingdom
Mudstone formations
Aptian Stage

Lower Cretaceous Series of Europe